Hleb may refer to:

Alexander Hleb (born 1981), Belarusian footballer
Vyacheslav Hleb (born 1983), Belarusian footballer
Hleb Harbuz (born 1994), Belarusian handball player
Hleb, Leningrad album